The 2004 J.League Division 1 season was the 12th season of the J1 League. The league fixture began on March 13, 2004 and ended on December 11, 2004. The Suntory Championship 2004 took place on December 5 and December 11, 2004. The first ever J.League Promotion / relegation Series took place on December 4 and December 12, 2004.

General

Promotion and relegation 
 At the end of the 2003 Season, Albirex Niigata and Sanfrecce Hiroshima were promoted to J1
 At the end of the 2003 Season, Vegalta Sendai and Kyoto Purple Sanga were relegated to J2.

Changes in Competition Formats 
 This was the last J.League Division 1 season to be competed in two stages (or two halves).
 This was also the last J.League Division 1 season with 16 clubs. Next season division was expanded to 18 clubs.

Changes in clubs 
none

Clubs 

Following sixteen clubs participated in J.League Division 1 during 2004 season. Of these clubs, Albirex Nigata and Sanfrecce Hiroshima were newly promoted from Division 2.

 Kashima Antlers
 Urawa Red Diamonds
 JEF United Ichihara
 Kashiwa Reysol
 FC Tokyo
 Tokyo Verdy 1969
 Yokohama F. Marinos
 Albirex Nigata 
 Shimizu S-Pulse
 Jublio Iwata
 Nagoya Grampus Eight
 Gamba Osaka
 Cerezo Osaka
 Vissel Kobe
 Sanfrecce Hiroshima 
 Oita Trinita

Format 
In the 2004 season, the league was conducted split-season format, 1st Stage and 2nd Stage.  In each stage, sixteen clubs played in a single round-robin format, a total of 15 games per club (per stage).  A club received 3 points for a win, 1 point for a tie, and 0 points for a loss. The club were ranked by points, and tie breakers are, in the following order:
 Goal differential 
 Goals scored 
 Head-to-head results
A draw would be conducted, if necessary. The club that finished at the top of the table is declared stage champion and qualifies for the Suntory Championship.  The first stage winner, hosts the first leg in the championship series.  If a single club wins both stages, the club is declared the season champions and championship series will not be held.  Meanwhile, the last-placed (16th-placed) club must play Pro/Rele Series at the end of the season.

Changes in competition format
 No direct relegation this year, due to expansion of Division 1 in the following season
 Last-placed (16th placed) club plays Pro/Rele Series at the end of the season

First stage

Table

Results

Second stage

Table

Results

Suntory Championship 
Yokohama F. Marinos won the first stage and thus hosted the first game. They won the first leg by 1–0 thanks to Ryuji Kawai's goal. In the second leg, Alessandro Santos scored from the free kick in 76th minute to level the aggregate score. The clubs played in sudden death extra time, however neither club could break the scoreline. Yokohama upset the home club in the penalties winning them and series overall.

Overall table

Top scorers

Attendance figures

Awards

Individual

Best Eleven 

* The number in brackets denotes the number of times that the footballer has appeared in the Best 11.

References 

J1 League seasons
1
Japan
Japan